Andrej Podkonický (born 9 May 1978) is a Slovak former professional ice hockey player. He played in the National Hockey League (NHL) with the Florida Panthers and the Washington Capitals. He is currently the head coach of HC Slovan Bratislava, of the Slovak Extraliga.

Playing career
Podkonický was born in Zvolen, Czechoslovakia. As a youth, he played in the 1992 Quebec International Pee-Wee Hockey Tournament with a team from Slovakia.

He was drafted 196th overall by the St. Louis Blues in the 1996 NHL Entry Draft. After two seasons with the American Hockey League's Worcester IceCats, he was traded to the Florida Panthers for Eric Boguniecki on December 17, 2000. He played six games for the Panthers during the 2000–01 NHL season, scoring one goal.  Podkonický then moved to Europe and played for HIFK in Finland's SM-liiga, HC Slovan Bratislava in the Slovak Extraliga and the Iserlohn Roosters in Germany's Deutsche Eishockey Liga. He signed with the Washington Capitals in 2003 and was assigned to the AHL's Portland Pirates, playing just two games for the Capitals.  Podkonický then moved back to the Czech Republic and signed for HC Bílí Tygři Liberec.  He spent the 2007–08 season in Russia for Vityaz Chekhov before returning to Liberec.

International play
Podkonický played for Slovakia at the 2007 IIHF World Championship and the 2008 IIHF World Championship.

Career statistics

Regular season and playoffs

International

Awards and honours

References

External links

1978 births
Living people
BK Mladá Boleslav players
Florida Panthers players
HC Bílí Tygři Liberec players
HC Slovan Bratislava players
HC Vityaz players
HIFK (ice hockey) players
HKM Zvolen players
Iserlohn Roosters players
HC Kometa Brno players
Louisville Panthers players
Sportspeople from Zvolen
Portland Pirates players
Portland Winterhawks players
St. Louis Blues draft picks
Slovak expatriate ice hockey players in Germany
Slovak ice hockey left wingers
Slovakia men's national ice hockey team coaches
Washington Capitals players
Worcester IceCats players
Slovak expatriate ice hockey players in Russia
Slovak expatriate ice hockey players in the United States
Slovak expatriate ice hockey players in Finland
Slovak expatriate ice hockey players in the Czech Republic